Ante Mrmić (born 6 August 1992) is a Croatian football goalkeeper who plays for Tehničar 1974 in the Prva HNL.

Career
Mrmić was part of the Varaždin youth system, and also started his senior career with Varaždin.  This Varaždin organisation suffered repeated financial difficulties while he was with them, and eventually folded in 2015. The NK Varaždin he plays for since 2018 is not associated with his earlier club, and the two actually co-existed for three years.

He joined Tehničar 1974 in summer 2020.

References

External links
 

1992 births
Living people
Sportspeople from Vinkovci
Association football goalkeepers
Croatian footballers
NK Varaždin players
GNK Dinamo Zagreb players
NK Vinogradar players
HNK Segesta players
NK Zavrč players
NK Bistra players
NK Inter Zaprešić players
NK Varaždin (2012) players
Croatian Football League players
First Football League (Croatia) players
Slovenian PrvaLiga players
Croatian expatriate footballers
Expatriate footballers in Slovenia
Croatian expatriate sportspeople in Slovenia